The Aberdeen and Briar Patch Railway  was a short-line railroad which operated in North Carolina. The company operated a former Norfolk Southern line between Star and Aberdeen, North Carolina. The company was founded in 1983, began operating in 1984, and was sold in 1987.

History 
The Aberdeen and Briar Patch owned a  line between Star and Aberdeen in North Carolina. This line began as a logging railroad in the 1880s, eventually passing to the Norfolk Southern in 1916. In 1983 the Norfolk Southern, then doing business as the Carolina and Northwestern Railway, decided to abandon the line. The Aberdeen and Briar Patch was incorporated on August 1, 1983, and acquired the line. It began operating in 1984. The Aberdeen, Carolina and Western Railway acquired the assets of the company on June 19, 1987.

Notes

References 
 
 

Defunct North Carolina railroads
Spin-offs of the Norfolk Southern Railway
Railway companies established in 1983
Railway companies disestablished in 1987